Karl Reichlin (24 February 1841 – 22 October 1924) was a Swiss politician and President of the Swiss Council of States (1901/1902).

External links 
 
 

1841 births
1924 deaths
Members of the Council of States (Switzerland)
Presidents of the Council of States (Switzerland)